Laur is an Estonian surname, the 50th most popular. 

Notable people with the surname include:

 Jarno Laur (born 1975), politician
 Katrin Laur (born 1955), film director, producer and scenarist
 Mati Laur (born 1955), historian
 Tiido Laur (1882–1930), politician and archivist
 Uno Laur (born 1961), musician
 Ferdinand Samuel Laur, Swiss composer, conductor, choirmaster, and music teacher

See also
 Lauer (surname)

 Lau (disambiguation)

 Laura – Laure – Lauri – Lauro – Laurus

References

Estonian-language surnames